Vardarski Rid is an archaeological site in Gevgelija, North Macedonia of a town dating from Early Antiquity. Archaeological excavations reveal the architectural layout of the monumental stoa, an acropolis, and other segments from the settlement. Vardarski Rid is also used today as a picnic spot.

Geography
Vardarski Rid is located in the central part of the Lower Vardar Valley. It is located at a dominant strategic position above the Gevgelija Plain, Gevgelija, and the Vardar River. The Vardar River surrounds the ancient town's northern and eastern border. The lowlands of the Gevgelija Plain stretch west and south of Vardarski Rid. The site consists of two hills, one hill is taller and steeper, and the other is shorter.

Museum
Parts of the excavations are exhibited in the municipal museum, Gevgelija.

See also
Heraclea Lyncestis
Stobi

External links
 Official site of Vardarski Rid

Archaeological sites in North Macedonia
Former populated places in the Balkans
Gevgelija Municipality